DX10 is an operating system for the Texas Instruments TI-990 CPU.

DX10 or DX-10 may refer to:

 DirectX 10
 Direct3D 10, a part of Microsoft's DirectX application programming interface
 Fujifilm DX-10, an early digital camera made by Fujifilm

See also
 DX9
 DX11